Alar Karis (born 26 March 1958) is an Estonian molecular geneticist, developmental biologist, civil servant and politician who, since 11 October 2021, has served as the sixth president of Estonia.

Prior to presidency 
Karis was born in Tartu on 26 March 1958 as son of botanist Harry Karis. He graduated from the Estonian Agricultural Academy in 1981. In 1999 he became a professor at the University of Tartu.

Karis served as rector of the Estonian University of Life Sciences from 2003 to 2007, as rector of the University of Tartu from 2007 to 2012, as the Auditor General of Estonia from 2013 to 2018, and as director of the Estonian National Museum from 2018 to 2021.

2021 presidential election 
In August 2021, he was approached by the president of the Riigikogu Jüri Ratas with a prospect of nomination for the post of president of Estonia in the upcoming autumn election. He accepted the nomination and his candidacy was subsequently endorsed by both coalition parties, the Reform Party and the Centre Party. On 31 August 2021, Karis was elected as the president of Estonia with a two thirds majority of 72 votes in the Riigikogu. He assumed the office on 11 October 2021.

The election received criticism and calls for electoral reform due to the absence of opposing candidates. Referencing the "turmoil that surrounded the presidential selection process" in his post election speech, Karis called for changes of the system to be examined by the Riigikogu, such as using an enlarged electoral college, facilitating the nomination of candidates or even using direct election.

Personal life
He has been married to Sirje Karis ​since 1977, with whom he has 3 children and 5 grandchildren. Besides Estonian, Karis is fluent in English and Russian. Although he is fluent in Russian, he has admitted that it needs some practice since he has not had to speak the language in a long time.

Honours

National honour
 Grand Master of the Order of the National Coat of Arms (11 October 2021)
 Grand Master of the Order of the Cross of Terra Mariana
 Grand Master of the Order of the White Star
 IV Class of the Order of the White Star (2007)
 Grand Master of the Order of the Cross of the Eagle
 Grand Master of the Order of the Estonian Red Cross

Foreign honour
 Commander’s cross of the Order of Leopold II (2008)
 Commander 1st Class of the Order of the Lion of Finland (2013)
 3rd Class of the Cross of Recognition (2019)
 Commander 1st Class of the Royal Order of the Polar Star (2011)

References

Living people
1958 births
Estonian geneticists
Estonian biologists
Estonian civil servants
Miina Härma Gymnasium alumni
Estonian University of Life Sciences alumni
Academic staff of the Estonian University of Life Sciences
Academic staff of the University of Tartu
Rectors of the University of Tartu
Presidents of Estonia
Rectors of universities in Estonia
Recipients of the Order of the White Star, 4th Class
People from Tartu